Hidden Enemy is a 1940 American thriller film directed by Howard Bretherton and starring Warren Hull, Kay Linaker and Wilhelm von Brincken.

Synopsis
A newspaper reporter encounters a gang of German spies attempting to steal industrial secrets.

Cast
 Warren Hull as Bill MacGregor 
 Kay Linaker as Sonia Manning 
 Wilhelm von Brincken as Professor Werner 
 George Cleveland as John MacGregor 
 Fern Emmett as Aunt Mary 
 Edward Keane as Newspaper Editor 
 Willy Castello as Eric Bowman 
 John Sheehan as Marden 
 Herbert Corthell as Pete 
 Vince Rush as Gruen 
 Tristram Coffin as Newspaper Reporter
 I. Stanford Jolley as German Agent
 Paul Newlan as German Agent 
 Hans Wollenberger as Mueller

References

Bibliography
 McCarty, Clifford. Film Composers in America: A Filmography, 1911-1970. Oxford University Press, 2000.

External links
 

1940 films
American thriller films
Films directed by Howard Bretherton
Monogram Pictures films
American black-and-white films
1940s thriller films
1940s English-language films
1940s American films